British Canoeing is a national governing body for canoeing in the United Kingdom. Established in 1936 as the British Canoe Union, in 2000 it federalised to become the umbrella organisation for the home nation associations in Scotland (Scottish Canoe Association), Wales (Canoe Wales) and Northern Ireland (Canoe Association of Northern Ireland). In 2015 it took on the name British Canoeing and amalgamated the former BCU, Canoe England and GB Canoeing.

History 
1887 saw the formation of the British Canoe Association, which lasted about thirty years. Revived in 1933, it merged with the Canoe Section of the Camping Club of Great Britain. In March 1936, representatives of the Canoe Section of the Camping Club, Clyde Canoe Club, Manchester Canoe Club, and the Royal Canoe Club, formed the British Canoe Union.

It was incorporated as a company on 30, October, 1980.

The BCU operated as a membership organisation for canoeists resident in England and worked in cooperation with its counterparts in the other home nations: Scotland (Scottish Canoe Association – SCA), Wales (Canoe Wales), and Northern Ireland (Canoe Association of Northern Ireland – CANI), at first informally and then through a series of agreements reached first in 1976 and most recently updated in 2018. The BCU rebranded as British Canoeing in 2014 and in the most recent agreement, British Canoeing undertook to resolve the role confusion caused by referring to its responsibilities exclusively for England as British, as well as its British responsibilities carried out on behalf of all 4 home nations. This much needed clarity is currently understood to be being progressed.

Canoeing refers to the paddling of an open, non-decked craft (though there are decked canoes) propelled by a single-bladed paddle, generally in a kneeling position, while kayaking involves a closed-deck craft driven by a double-bladed paddle from a seated position. The term canoeing in the UK is often used generically to cover both kayaking and canoeing, in contrast to North American usage where the different terms are used.

In 2014 the organisation started rebranding, “Going forward, the British Canoe Union, Canoe England & GB Canoeing will be known collectively as British Canoeing.”  (http://www.bcu.org.uk/news/a-new-look-for-canoeing)

Function 
British Canoeing is responsible for leading and setting the overall framework for the National Associations; representing canoeing interests such as coaching and competition at UK and international level.

It formulates standards for training programmes with certification levels. It administers a range of personal performance awards and coaching awards, some of which are recognised by the UKCC.

Structure 
British Canoeing is a membership organisation for canoeists resident in England and it also carries out certain UK-wide roles on behalf of itself and the other 3 home nation associations: The Scottish Canoe Association, The Welsh Canoeing Association, and The Canoe Association of Northern Ireland, most particularly the training and organisation of international teams which participate in competitions under the control of the International Canoe Federation. It is concerned with all paddlesports, recreational as well as competitive, in open and closed craft, paddled with single and double-bladed paddles, on inland and coastal waters as well as open ocean.

It is headquartered in National Water Sports Centre, Nottinghamshire, England, which was until recently also the base of Canoe England. Previously they were based in Bingham, Nottinghamshire.

The organisation creates the rules for competitive canoeing used throughout the UK and has over 30,000 individual members, 625 affiliated clubs, and 145 approved centres. It is unique among national sporting certifying bodies in requiring continuous membership for qualifications to remain valid; thus its membership is not strictly voluntary and may not accurately reflect the organisation's popularity.

Waterways Licences 
Many waterways in England and Wales are managed for boat traffic by a Navigation Authority. On these waterways all boat traffic, including unpowered craft such as rowing boats and canoes, require a licence. British Canoeing provides its members with a licence to use their canoes, kayaks, and SUPs on most of these managed waterways, including those managed by the two largest Navigation Authorities: the Canal & River Trust and the Environment Agency. This means British Canoeing's members do not need to buy separate licence from each authority.

Campaigns 
British Canoeing has been attempting for over fifty years to increase the extremely limited public access to English and Welsh rivers. It recently started a Rivers Access Campaign which aims to raise public awareness of the problems that kayakers and canoeists face in accessing the rivers of England and Wales (the right to paddle on Scottish rivers is already written into the law). This campaign aims to bring about changes in the law for England and Wales similar to those now established in Scotland that will open up more rivers to the public.

British Canoeing's official charity partner is the Canoe Foundation.

References

External links 
 
 Canoe Foundation – Official Charity Partner of the BCU and Home Nation Associations

Great Britain
Canoeing
Canoeing in the United Kingdom
Organisations based in Nottinghamshire
Sports organizations established in 1936
Sport in Nottinghamshire
1936 establishments in the United Kingdom